21st Ohio Battery was an artillery battery that served in the Union Army during the American Civil War.

Service
The 21st Ohio Battery was organized at Camp Dennison near Cincinnati, Ohio and mustered in April 29, 1863, for a three-year enlistment under Captain James W. Patterson.

The battery was attached to Willcox's Left Wing, IX Corps, Department of the Ohio, to October 1863. 2nd Brigade, Left Wing, Department of the Ohio, to January 1864. District of the Clinch, Department of the Ohio, to April 1864. 2nd Brigade, 4th Division, XXIII Corps, Department of the Ohio, to February 1865. 2nd Brigade, 4th Division, District of East Tennessee, Department of the Cumberland, to July 1865.

The 21st Ohio Battery mustered out of service on July 21, 1865.

Detailed service
Ordered to West Virginia May 5. Returned to Camp Dennison May 20, and served duty there until September. Pursuit of Morgan through Indiana and Ohio July 5–28. Moved to Camp Nelson, Kentucky, September 22. Moved from Camp Nelson, to Greenville, Tennessee, October 1. Action at Blue Springs October 10. Walker's Ford December 2. Duty at various points in Tennessee and Alabama until July 1865.

Casualties
The battery lost a total of 9 men during service; 1 officer and 8 enlisted men died due to disease.

Commanders
 Captain James W. Patterson

See also

 List of Ohio Civil War units
 Ohio in the Civil War

References
 Dyer, Frederick H.  A Compendium of the War of the Rebellion (Des Moines, IA:  Dyer Pub. Co.), 1908.
 Ohio Roster Commission. Official Roster of the Soldiers of the State of Ohio in the War on the Rebellion, 1861–1865, Compiled Under the Direction of the Roster Commission (Akron, OH: Werner Co.), 1886–1895.
 Reid, Whitelaw. Ohio in the War: Her Statesmen, Her Generals, and Soldiers (Cincinnati, OH: Moore, Wilstach, & Baldwin), 1868. 
Attribution

External links
 Ohio in the Civil War: 21st Ohio Battery by Larry Stevens

Military units and formations established in 1863
Military units and formations disestablished in 1865
Units and formations of the Union Army from Ohio
1863 establishments in Ohio
Artillery units and formations of the American Civil War